Henry Richard Yeoville Yardley Thomason (17 July 1826 – 19 July 1901) was a British architect active in Birmingham. He was born in Edinburgh to a Birmingham family, and set up his own practice in Birmingham 1853–54.

Life

Yeoville Thomason was a grandson of Sir Edward Thomason, a silversmith and medallist in Birmingham, and son of Henry Botfield Thomason and Elizabeth Yardley.

He was a pupil of Charles Edge, and after qualifying as an architect he worked for the borough surveyor. He designed the Council House after winning a competition.

As architect to Birmingham, Dudley and District Banking Company he designed several bank buildings in the area.

He retired in 1896. He died in 1901 and is buried in Kensal Green Cemetery.

Significant works
He designed, amongst others:

In Birmingham:
The Council House and its immediate extension, the original Art Gallery, 1874–85, Grade II* listed 
Singers Hill Synagogue, 1856, Grade II* listed
Great Hampton Works, 80–82 Great Hampton Street, Hockley, c 1880, Grade II* listed
Union Club, 85–89 Colmore Row, on the corner with Newhall Street, now called Bamford's Trust House, 1870, Grade II listed The new building was noted by the Illustrated London News in 1869.
Birmingham Banking Company, Bennetts Hill, Birmingham. Designed new entrance in 1868. Became Midland Bank. Grade II listed
38 Benetts Hill, 1868–70, Grade II listed
Highcroft Hospital, Main Building, Highcroft Road, Erdington (former Aston Union Workhouse). 1869, Grade II listed
Birmingham Town and District Bank, 63 Colmore Row, Birmingham. (1867–69) Head Office later to become part of Barclays Bank, facade later remodelled by Peacock and Bewlay.
Lewis's department store, Corporation Street, 1886, (demolished 1929 and replaced by a seven storey building), Birmingham's first iron and concrete building
Acocks Green Chapel, Warwick Green, Acocks Green, 1860 (closed in 1956).
St Asaph's Church, Birmingham 1868 (demolished 1961)
St John the Baptist's church, Harborne (destroyed by enemy action, 1941)
Elsewhere:
Public Hall, High Street, Smethwick, (1866–67), now the Public Library.

References

External links 
 The Victorian Society in Birmingham (Three City Trails, Victorian Architects of Birmingham)

1826 births
1901 deaths
19th-century British architects
Architects from Birmingham, West Midlands
Burials at Kensal Green Cemetery